South Semitic is a putative branch of the Semitic languages, which form a branch of the larger Afro-Asiatic language family, found in (North and East) Africa and Western Asia.

History 
The "homeland" of the South Semitic languages is widely debated, with sources such as A. Murtonen (1967) and Lionel Bender (1997) suggesting an origin in Ethiopia and others suggesting the southern portion of the Arabian Peninsula. A 2009 study based on a Bayesian model to estimate language change concluded that the latter viewpoint is more probable. This statistical analysis could not estimate when or where the ancestor of all Semitic languages diverged from Afroasiatic but it suggested that the divergence of the East, Central, and South Semitic branches occurred in the Levant.  according to theory believed by many scholars now  Semitic originated from an offshoot of a still earlier language in North Africa and desertization made its inhabitants to migrate in the fourth millennium BC into what is now Ethiopia, others northwest out of Africa into West Asia

Classification 
South Semitic is divided into two uncontroversial branches:

 Western
 Old South Arabian – possibly extinct, formerly believed to be the linguistic ancestors of modern South Arabian Semitic languages, modern South Arabian now being classified as Eastern South Semitic. The Razihi language and Faifi language are probably descendants.
 Ethiopian Semitic languages (Ethio-Semitic, Ethiopian Semitic) on the southern coast of the Arabian Peninsula and found across the Red Sea in the Horn of Africa, mainly in modern Ethiopia and Eritrea.
 Eastern
 Modern South Arabian. These languages are spoken mainly by small minority populations on the Arabian Peninsula in Yemen (Mahra and Soqotra) and Oman (Dhofar).

Demographics 
The Ethiopian Semitic languages collectively have by far the greatest numbers of modern native speakers of any Semitic language other than Arabic. Eritrea's main languages are mainly Tigrinya and Tigre, which are North Ethiopic languages, and Amharic (South Ethiopic) is the main language spoken in Ethiopia (along with Tigrinya in the northern province of Tigray). Ge'ez continues to be used in Eritrea and Ethiopia as a liturgical language for the Orthodox Tewahedo churches.

Southern Arabian languages have been increasingly eclipsed by the more dominant Arabic (also a Semitic language) for more than a millennium. Ethnologue lists six modern members of the South Arabian branch and 15 members of the Ethiopian branch.

See also 
 Afroasiatic languages

References 

 
Semitic languages